Valery Karlovich Gartung (born 12 November 1960) is a Russian politician serving as the Member of the State Duma since 1997.

Biography
He was born on 12 November 1960 in Kopeysk of Chelyabinsk Oblast in the family of a miner. Father is German, mother is Etkul Cossack, raised three children.

In 1978 he graduated from school. In 1983 he graduated from the faculty of automotive engineering of South Ural State University with a degree in mechanical engineering (with honors). Since 1983 he worked at the Chelyabinsk blacksmith-press plant as a mechanic, master, senior master, head of the site. Since 1988 - Chairman of the cooperative "Leader" (production of sports equipment and spare parts for cars), since 1992 was a General Director of the insurance company "AMESK". From 1996 to 1997 was a General Director of JSC "Chelyabinsk forge-and-press plant".

In 1997 he founded the Children's Charity Fund named after Valery Gartung, which is headed by his wife Marina Gartung.

Political career

On 14 December 1997, at the by-election in the 186 single-mandate constituency of the Chelyabinsk Oblast, he was elected to the State Duma. In the State Duma he was a member of the parliamentary group "Russian Regions" and a member of the State Duma Committee on Budget, Taxes, Banks and Finance.

In 1999 he was re-elected to the State Duma in the same constituency, was a member of the parliamentary group "People's Deputy" and a member of the State Duma Committee on Budget and Taxes.

In the 2000 presidential election he was a trustee of presidential candidate Vladimir Putin. In December 2000, he ran for Governor of Chelyabinsk Oblast, took third place in the election, gaining 14% of the vote.

On 7 December 2003, he was re-elected to the State Duma from the 186 single-mandate constituency (68.5% of voters voted for him). Initially he was a member of the United Russia faction, later came out of their faction and more registered in the parliamentary association is not included. He was a member of the State Duma Committee on Budget and Taxes, and then a member of the State Duma Committee on Industry, Construction and High Technology.

In January 2002 he was elected Chairman of the Chelyabinsk regional branch of the Russian Party of Pensioners (RPP), as well as a member of its Central Council. At the extraordinary Congress of RPP on 31 January 2004 was appointed as Acting Chairman of the party (instead of Sergey Atroshenko). At the V Congress of RPP on 27 March 2004 almost unanimously (86 voted for his candidacy and only 1 — against) was elected Chairman of the Russian Party of Pensioners. In 2005, by a court decision was dismissed from the post of Chairman of RPP, in November 2006, the Presidium of the Moscow City Court overturned the decision of Meshchansky District Court on the recognition of incompetent decisions of IV and V Congresses of RPP, where Hartung was elected Chairman of the Party.

In 2007 he became the member of A Just Russia party.

In 2007 and 2011 and 2016, he was re-elected to the State Duma by A Just Russia party list in the Federal constituency.

Gartung is the deputy head of A Just Russia parliamentary group. He is a member of the State Duma Commission on Parliamentary Ethics and First Deputy Chairman of the State Duma Committee on Economic Policy, Industry, Innovation Development and Entrepreneurship.

Personal life
He is married, has two sons and enjoys sports — power triathlon and basketball. Wife Marina Gartung graduated from the South Ural State University, the head of the "Children's Charity Fund named after Valery Gartung". In 2015, she was elected to the Legislative Assembly of Chelyabinsk Oblast, but refused the mandate.

References

1960 births
Living people
People from Kopeysk
Russian people of German descent
A Just Russia politicians
People's Party of the Russian Federation politicians
20th-century Russian politicians
21st-century Russian politicians
Second convocation members of the State Duma (Russian Federation)
Third convocation members of the State Duma (Russian Federation)
Fourth convocation members of the State Duma (Russian Federation)
Fifth convocation members of the State Duma (Russian Federation)
Sixth convocation members of the State Duma (Russian Federation)
Seventh convocation members of the State Duma (Russian Federation)
Eighth convocation members of the State Duma (Russian Federation)